Most Beautiful Girl in Nigeria—also abbreviated as MBGN—is a pageant organised by Silverbird Group with the main purpose of sending representatives to international competitions.

Titleholders
Until 2007, only MBGN winners were sent abroad to represent the country at International level. The pageant has since been revamped to produce several more representatives, with the most consistent being MBGN World, MBGN Universe, and MBGN Tourism. The following is a list of all MBGN titleholders since 2007.

 Joy Ngozika Obasi won Miss ECOWAS 2009 in Port Harcourt, Nigeria.
 Diana Odiaka placed Top 20 Miss Tourism Queen International 2009 and awarded Continental Queen Africa in Zhangzhou, China.
 Damiete competed at the Miss World 2012 in Sanya China.. She previously named as the winner of MBGN Universe.
 Isabella has been replaced by MBGN Universe 2012, Damiete Charles-Granville. According to Silverbird Group’s Vice President Guy Murray Bruce, Isabella will not participate in the Miss World 2012 competition due to “personal reasons”. Isabella competed at the Miss Universe 2012 in Las Vegas, USA.

Miss Universe Nigeria
Color key

Miss World Nigeria
Color key

Most Beautiful Girl in Nigeria
1986 establishments in Nigeria
Nigerian awards
Beauty pageants in Nigeria